Eye-rolling is a gesture in which a person briefly turns their eyes upward, often in an arcing motion from one side to the other. In the Anglosphere, it has been identified as a passive-aggressive response to an undesirable situation or person. The gesture is used to disagree or dismiss or express contempt for the targeted person without physical contact.

History 
Eye-rolling has been present in literature since at least the 16th century, according to the Oxford English Dictionary. William Shakespeare periodically would use the gesture in his works to portray lust or passion for another character, as used in his poem The Rape of Lucrece. In his time, eye-rolling was used commonly as an expression of desire or flirtation, and it continued to be used in his way in literature for centuries. Up until about the 1950s this same meaning was used in music and films, but began translating to the meaning known today. The widespread use of eye-rolling in a negative connotation wasn't present until the 1980s.

In society 

The facial expression is one of the most common forms of non-verbal communication among humans. When studying exclusively adolescent females, the eye-roll gesture was observed to be the most prominent response to displeasure. Thirteen-year-old girls showed eye-rolling to be the main sign of aggression toward their peers in social situations. Eye-rolling is often accompanied by crossing of the arms and throwing the head or body back in an increased effort to symbolize avoidance or displeasure. Avoidance may be characterized by conveying hostility or distancing, often with the purpose of ending a relationship of any kind.

A study conducted by John Gottman states that contemptuous behavior like eye-rolling is the top factor of predicting divorce, followed by criticism, defensiveness, and stonewalling. The gesture shows the other party that what they are doing is so undesirable that it is not even worth looking at or giving a thought, which is why many relationships are destroyed by excessive use of the action.

In 2010, members of the city council of Elmhurst, Illinois, wished to make a law outlawing eye-rolling.

In 2018, a Chinese journalist's eye-rolling became international news. She rolled her eyes while exasperated by another journalist's excessive obsequiousness towards a government official, and got censored as a result, with CNN reporting rumors that her press credentials were revoked because of the eye-rolling.

Evolution 
There has been much speculation about the hypothesis that eye-rolling is an evolutionary trait of women, which would explain why it is performed more by females than their male counterparts. Psychologists suggest that it was developed as "a low-risk way to express aggression and disapproval". Women in the past were more motivated to use survival tactics that did not involve physical violence in conflict including cut-eye, or side-eye, likely related to maternal instincts. The action of looking away in rejection or disapproval has been traced to many different cultures, who use eye-rolling for similar purposes, suggesting that it is a somewhat innate reaction to unpleasant stimuli.

See also
 List of gestures

References

External links
 

Facial expressions
Gestures
Human eye